Miko Stefanovic (August 19, 1908 – August 5, 2005), better known as Lyle 'Spud' Murphy, was an American jazz multi-instrumentalist, bandleader, and arranger.

Early life
Born Miko Stefanovic to Serbian émigré parents in Berlin, Germany, Murphy grew up in Salt Lake City, Utah, where he took the name of a childhood friend.

Music career
Murphy studied clarinet and saxophone when young and took trumpet lessons from Red Nichols's father. He worked with Jimmy Joy in 1927–28 and with Ross Gorman and Slim Lamar (on oboe) in 1928. He worked in the early 1930s as saxophonist and arranger for Austin Wylie, Jan Garber, Mal Hallett, and Joe Haymes, then became a staff arranger for Benny Goodman from 1935–1937. At the same time he contributed arrangements for the Casa Loma Orchestra, Isham Jones, and Les Brown.

From 1937–1940 Murphy led a big band, and from 1938–39 recorded for Decca Records and Bluebird Records. In the 1940s he moved to Los Angeles, where worked in studios and film music, in addition to writing and teaching the 1200-page System of Horizontal Composition (a.k.a. "Equal Interval System"). He recorded two jazz albums in the 1950s, but his later career was focused on classical and film music. In the film world, Murphy was staff composer and arranger for Columbia Pictures under Morris Stoloff. He worked on over 50 films, including The Tony Fontane Story, which won him the Neff Award for best music score.

In addition to being a talented composer, arranger, and musician, Murphy became a renowned educator, writing over 26 books on various topics in music, such as instrumental techniques and music theory. His crowning achievement was his 12-volume course in composing, arranging, and orchestration for the professional musician titled The Equal Interval System. He taught mostly in Los Angeles but also a special course at the Mount Royal Conservatory in Calgary, Canada. He was an instructor who was voted Educator of the Year in 1990 by the Los Angeles Jazz Society. Murphy died in Los Angeles two weeks short of his 97th birthday. In 2003, orchestra leader Dean Mora, a friend of Murphy, recorded some two dozen of his arrangements in a tribute CD, Goblin Market.

Equal Interval System (EIS)
The Equal Interval System (EIS) (also known as the System of Horizontal Composition based on Equal Intervals) is a modern system of music composition developed by Murphy over a lifetime of research. Several courses based upon the EIS system are taught at Pasadena City College. Many notable composers and arrangers have been students of the Equal Interval System, such as Tom Chase, Gerald Wiggins, Jimmie Haskell, Richard Firth, Mary Ekler, David Blumberg, Steve Marston, Clair Marlo, Dan Sawyer, Don Novello, Don Peake, Danny Pelfrey, Craig Sharmat, Scott Paige, James L. Venable, Marcos Valle and Oscar Peterson.

Discography
 Four Saxophones in Twelve Tones (GNP Crescendo, 1955)
 New Orbits in Sound (GNP Crescendo, 1955–57)
 Gone with the Woodwinds (Contemporary, 1955)
 Twelve-Tone Compositions and Arrangements by Lyle (Contemporary, 1955)

References

 Dean Mora's Modern Rhythmists, Goblin Market (Mr. Ace Records)
 Scott Yanow, [ Spud Murphy] Allmusic

External links

 
 The Equal Interval System
 Murphy biography and radio interview

1908 births
2005 deaths
American jazz bandleaders
American jazz multi-instrumentalists
American music arrangers
Contemporary Records artists
GNP Records artists
American people of Serbian descent
People from Marin County, California
Burials at Forest Lawn Memorial Park (Glendale)
20th-century American musicians
Casa Loma Orchestra members
Jazz musicians from California